Galadari Brothers are a conglomerate company based in the United Arab Emirates.

History 

In 1976, the brothers split with Abdul Rahim and Abdul Latif retaining the business by buying out Abdul Wahab.

In 2006, the government of Dubai took a 30 per cent stake in the conglomerate. It was reported the 30 per cent stake replaced Galadari's debt to the government and other companies. A court-appointed by Mohammad Bin Rashid Al Maktoum, the Vice President and Prime Minister of the United Arab Emirates, first restructured the group and then replaced the board with a three-member temporary board.

Businesses 
Galadari Brothers has investments in print and online media in the Middle East. Other companies under the Galadari Group in the UAE include Mazda UAE, Baskin-Robbins Ice Cream, Galadari Hotel in Colombo, Galadari Construction, JCB General heavy equipment. The group also has stakes in Galadari Cement in Karachi, Pakistan.

References

External links 

 

Conglomerate companies of the United Arab Emirates